Nana Mizuki Live Museum x Universe is the 5th live DVD release from J-pop star and voice actress Nana Mizuki. It has 4 discs containing her two concerts Live Museum 2007 and Live Universe 2006 ~summer~.

Live Museum 2007

Live Museum 2007 was held on 12 February 2007 in Yokohama Arena. It had an audience of 12,000 and is Nana Mizuki's longest live concert to date.

Disc 1

Tears' Night
Transmigration 2007

Nocturne-revision-

Violetta
Still In the Groove

 (acoustic)
 (acoustic)
Justice to Believe (Museum Style)
Eternal Blaze
Super Generation

POWER GATE

Disc 2

Heaven Knows
Crystal Letter
Secret Ambition

The Place of Happiness
Wild Eyes

New Sensation
Protection

Live Universe 2006 ~summer~

Live Universe 2006 ~summer~ was held on 29 July 2006 at the Hibiya Open-Air Concert Hall. Most of the songs were from her album Hybrid Universe.

Disc 3

Take A Shot
What Cheer？
Late Summer Tale

NAKED FEELS
You Have A Dream

Love Trippin'

Eternal Blaze
 (cover song)
 She was asked to perform a random song from one of her previous works. This song was the opening theme for Basilisk where she starred as the lead female Oboro. This song was originally sung by Onmyo-Za.

Disc 4

Primal Affection
Faith
Inside of mind
Super Generation
Power Gate

Innocent Starter
Rush & Dash!

Special features

Live Universe Making Movie
Live Museum Making Movie

External links
 Archive of Mizuki's personal blog 

Nana Mizuki video albums
Live video albums
Albums recorded at the Yokohama Arena
2007 video albums